Appreciative inquiry (AI) is a model that seeks to engage stakeholders in self-determined change. According to Gervase Bushe, professor of leadership and organization development at the Beedie School of Business and a researcher on the topic, "AI revolutionized the field of organization development and was a precursor to the rise of positive organization studies and the strengths based movement in American management." It was developed at Case Western Reserve University's department of organizational behavior, starting with a 1987 article by David Cooperrider and Suresh Srivastva.  They felt that the overuse of problem solving hampered any kind of social improvement, and what was needed were new methods of inquiry that would help generate new ideas and models for how to organize.

History 
Cooperrider and Srivastva took a social constructionist approach, arguing that organizations are created, maintained and changed by conversations, and claiming that methods of organizing were only limited by people's imaginations and the agreements among them.

In 2001, Cooperrider and Diana Whitney published an article outlining the five principles of AI.

In 1996, Cooperrider, Whitney and several of their colleagues became centrally involved using AI to mid-wife the creation of the United Religions Initiative, a global organization dedicated to promoting grassroots interfaith cooperation for peace, justice and healing. This early partnership between URI and AI is chronicled in Birth of a Global Community: Appreciative Inquiry in Action by Charles Gibbs and Sally Mahé.  AI was also used in the first (1999) and subsequent meetings of business leaders that created the UN Global Compact. In another of the early applications, Cooperrider and Whitney taught AI to employees of GTE (now part of Verizon) resulting in improvements in employees' support for GTE's business direction and as a part of continuous process improvement generated both improvements in revenue collection and cost savings earning GTE an Association for Talent Development award for the best organizational change program in the US in 1997.

On May 8, 2010, Suresh Srivastva died.

Bushe published a 2011 review of the model, including its processes, critiques, and evidence. He also published a history of the model in 2012.

Basis and principles 

According to Bushe, AI "advocates collective inquiry into the best of what is, in order to imagine what could be, followed by collective design of a desired future state that is compelling and thus, does not require the use of incentives, coercion or persuasion for planned change to occur."

The model is based on the assumption that the questions we ask will tend to focus our attention in a particular direction, that organizations evolve in the direction of the questions they most persistently and passionately ask. In the mid-1980s most methods of assessing and evaluating a situation and then proposing solutions were based on a deficiency model, predominantly asking questions such as "What are the problems?", "What's wrong?" or "What needs to be fixed?".  Instead of asking "What's the problem?", others couched the question in terms of "challenges", which still focused on deficiency, on what needs to be fixed or solved.  Appreciative inquiry was the first serious managerial method to refocus attention on what works, the positive core, and on what people really care about.  Today, these ways of approaching organizational change are common.

The five principles of AI are:
 The constructionist principle proposes that what we believe to be true determines what we do, and thought and action emerge from relationships.  Through the language and discourse of day to day interactions, people co-construct the organizations they inhabit.  The purpose of inquiry is to stimulate new ideas, stories and images that generate new possibilities for action.
 The principle of simultaneity proposes that as we inquire into human systems we change them and the seeds of change, the things people think and talk about, what they discover and learn, are implicit in the very first questions asked.  Questions are never neutral, they are fateful, and social systems move in the direction of the questions they most persistently and passionately discuss.
 The poetic principle proposes that organizational life is expressed in the stories people tell each other every day, and the story of the organization is constantly being co-authored.  The words and topics chosen for inquiry have an impact far beyond just the words themselves.  They invoke sentiments, understandings, and worlds of meaning. In all phases of the inquiry effort is put into using words that point to, enliven and inspire the best in people.
 The anticipatory principle posits that what we do today is guided by our image of the future.  Human systems are forever projecting ahead of themselves a horizon of expectation that brings the future powerfully into the present as a mobilizing agent. Appreciative inquiry uses artful creation of positive imagery on a collective basis to refashion anticipatory reality.
 The positive principle proposes that momentum and sustainable change requires positive affect and social bonding.  Sentiments like hope, excitement, inspiration, camaraderie and joy increase creativity, openness to new ideas and people, and cognitive flexibility.  They also promote the strong connections and relationships between people, particularly between groups in conflict, required for collective inquiry and change.

Some researchers believe that excessive focus on dysfunctions can actually cause them to become worse or fail to become better. By contrast, AI argues, when all members of an organization are motivated to understand and value the most favorable features of its culture, it can make rapid improvements.

Strength-based methods are used in the creation of organizational development strategy and implementation of organizational effectiveness tactics. The appreciative mode of inquiry often relies on interviews to qualitatively understand the organization's potential strengths by looking at an organization's experience and its potential; the objective is to elucidate the assets and personal motivations that are its strengths.

Bushe has argued that mainstream proponents of AI focus too much attention on "the positive" and not enough on the transformation that AI can bring about through generating new ideas and the will to act on them.  In a 2010 comparative study in a school district he found that even in cases where no change occurred participants were highly positive during the AI process.  What distinguished those sites that experienced transformational changes was the creation of new ideas that gave people new ways to address old problems.  He argues that for transformational change to occur, AI must address problems that concern people enough to want to change.  However, AI addresses them not through problem-solving, but through generative images. Some of this is covered in a 90-minute discussion about AI, positivity and generativity by Bushe and Dr. Ron Fry of Case Western, at the 2012 World Appreciative Inquiry Conference.

Distinguishing features 

The following table comes from the Cooperrider and Whitney (2001) article and is used to describe some of the distinctions between AI and approaches to organizational development not based on what they call positive potential:

Appreciative inquiry attempts to use ways of asking questions and envisioning the future in order to foster positive relationships and build on the present potential of a given person, organization or situation.  The most common model utilizes a cycle of four processes, which focus on what it calls:
DISCOVER: The identification of organizational processes that work well.
DREAM: The envisioning of processes that would work well in the future.
DESIGN: Planning and prioritizing processes that would work well.
DESTINY (or DEPLOY): The implementation (execution) of the proposed design.

The aim is to build – or rebuild – organizations around what works, rather than trying to fix what doesn't. AI practitioners try to convey this approach as the opposite of problem solving.

Implementing AI

There are a variety of approaches to implementing appreciative inquiry, including mass-mobilised interviews and a large, diverse gathering called an Appreciative Inquiry Summit.  These approaches involve bringing large, diverse groups of people together to study and build upon the best in an organization or community.

Uses 
In Vancouver, AI is being used by the Dalai Lama Center for Peace and Education. The center, which was founded by the Dalai Lama and Victor Chan, is using AI to facilitate compassionate communities.

See also
Geoffrey Vickers introduced concept of 'Appreciative Systems' (1968)
Kenneth J. Gergen instrumental in social constructionism and the concept of generativity
David Cooperrider originated the theory of appreciative inquiry in his 1986 doctoral dissertation.
 Organization development
 Social constructionism
 Complexity theory and organizations
 Appreciative inquiry in education

References

Further reading 
 
 
 
 
 
 
 
 
 
 Barrett, F.J. & Fry, R.E. (2005) Appreciative Inquiry: A Positive Approach to Building Cooperative Capacity.  Chagrin Falls, OH: Taos Institute
 Cooperrider, D.L., Whitney, D. & Stavros, J.M. (2008) Appreciative Inquiry Handbook (2nd ed.)  Brunswick, OH: Crown Custom Publishing. 
 Gibbs, C., Mahé, s. (2004) "Birth of a Global Community: Appreciative Inquiry in Action". Bedford Heights, OH: Lakeshore Publishers.
 Lewis, S., Passmore, J. & Cantore, S. (2008) The Appreciative Inquiry Approach to Change Management.  London, UK: Kogan Paul.
 Ludema, J.D. Whitney, D., Mohr, B.J. & Griffen, T.J. (2003) The Appreciative Inquiry Summit.  San Francisco: Berret-Koehler.
 Whitney, D. & Trosten-Bloom, A. (2010) The Power of Appreciative Inquiry (2nd Ed.).  San Francisco: Berrett-Koehler.

External links
 Appreciative Inquiry Commons by The David L. Cooperrider Center for Appreciative Inquiry
 Appreciative inquiry at Harvard Business School
 Appreciative Inquiry: An Overview, scribd.
 Bushe's papers on AI

Change management
Human resource management
Inquiry
Organizational behavior
Organizational theory
Social systems